Portland Jewish Academy is a private school in Portland, Oregon, in the United States. The school was established in 1986 with the merging of Hillel Academy, founded in 1961, and the Jewish Education Association, which had operated a Hebrew school program since 1934.

References

External links
 

1986 establishments in Oregon
Educational institutions established in 1986
Jews and Judaism in Portland, Oregon
Private schools in Oregon
Schools in Portland, Oregon